Saint-Hermas is a former municipality within the province of Quebec, Canada. Geographical coordinates are 45°39' North and 74°05' West.

In 1971 it amalgamated into the city of Mirabel, Quebec.

References

Former municipalities in Quebec
Populated places disestablished in 1971